Andrew Penn is the name of:

 Andy Penn (businessman), Chief Executive Officer of Telstra
 Andrew Penn (cricketer) (born 1974), New Zealand cricketer
 Andrew Penn (racewalker) (born 1967), British race walker
 Andy Penn (referee) (born 1971), British football referee